Raymond Decorte (Waarschoot, 17 March 1898 — Waarschoot, 30 March 1972) was a Belgian professional road bicycle racer. In the 1927 Tour de France, he won two stages and finished 11th in the general classification.

Major results

1927
1927 Tour de France:
Winner stages 8 and 20
11th place overall classification
1931
Kruishoutem

External links 

Official Tour de France results for Raymond Decorte

Belgian male cyclists
1898 births
1972 deaths
Belgian Tour de France stage winners
Cyclists from East Flanders
People from Waarschoot